Pavel Boychenko (born April 30, 1975) is a Russian professional ice hockey player who currently plays for Vityaz Chekhov of the Kontinental Hockey League (KHL).

External links

1975 births
Living people
HC Vityaz players
Russian ice hockey forwards
Krylya Sovetov Moscow players
HC CSKA Moscow players
HC Lada Togliatti players
HC Spartak Moscow players
SKA Saint Petersburg players
HC Khimik Voskresensk players
Traktor Chelyabinsk players